Mark McGrath (born July 15, 1968) is an English-born New Zealand professional darts player.

Career
McGrath qualified for the 2015 PDC World Darts Championship after winning the New Zealand Qualifier. He was whitewashed 4–0 by American Scott Kirchner in the preliminary round.

In 2016, McGrath claimed the New Zealand Masters and Alan King Memorial titles. McGrath qualified for the 2017 BDO World Darts Championship McGrath beat Roger Janssen 3-2 before losing 3–0 to the current World Champion Scott Mitchell. In 2018 McGrath won the Canterbury Classic and the Canterbury Open, McGrath also won The Auckland Open. McGrath also qualified for the 2018 Auckland Darts Masters he beat Michael Smith 6-4 before losing 10–4 to Raymond Van Barneveld. McGrath is the only person from New Zealand to have won a game at The Auckland Darts Masters. McGrath qualified for The 2019 BDO World Darts Championship (His third world championship). At The 2019 BDO World Championship McGrath beat Adam Smith-Neale the reigning Winmau World Masters Champion 3-0 McGrath then went on to lose 3–0 to reigning BDO World Champion Glen Durrant in the last 32. McGrath also won the New Zealand Open defeating AJ te Kira. McGrath was the New Zealand qualifier for the 2019 BDO World Darts Trophy where he reached the semi-finals and beat current BDO number one Wesley Harms this was the first time a New Zealander had reached a major televised darts semi-final. McGrath also represented New Zealand at the 2019 WDF World Cup in Romania

World Championship results

PDC
 2015: Last 72 (lost to Scott Kirchner 0–4) (legs)

BDO
 2017: 1st Round (lost to Scott Mitchell 0–3)
 2019: 1st Round (lost to Glen Durrant 0–3)

Personal life
McGrath was born and raised in Leeds until his family emigrated to New Zealand in 1981. Went to Horowhenua College until 1986. Married to Colette McGrath, 23 February 2013. McGrath has two children Jessica, Connor and Colette has 2 children Tayla, Brooke. McGrath works as Baker for his job. In his spare time he goes Jetski fishing. He is a member of Team Cowboy and his major sponsors are DartsNz.co.Nz, R J Roofing. He supports Leeds United.

References

External links

1968 births
Living people
British Darts Organisation players
English emigrants to New Zealand
New Zealand darts players
Professional Darts Corporation associate players
Sportspeople from Leeds